Martin John Kennedy (August 29, 1892 – October 27, 1955) was an Irish-American politician from New York. A real estate and insurance broker in New York City, Kennedy is most notable for his service as a Democratic member of the New York State Senate (1924-1930) and the United States House of Representatives (1930-1945).

Biography
Kennedy was born in New York City on August 29, 1892. He attended the public schools, and graduated from Columbia University in 1909; and from the College of the City of New York in 1914. Then he engaged in the real estate and insurance business, and entered politics.

World War II 
He served in the United States Army Intelligence during World War I; and was Chairman of the New York City School Board from 1918 to 1924.

State legislature 
He was a member of the New York State Senate (18th D.) from 1924 to 1930, sitting in the 147th through 153rd New York State Legislatures.

Congress 
Kennedy was elected as a Democrat to the 71st United States Congress to fill the vacancy caused by the resignation of John F. Carew, and was re-elected to the seven succeeding Congresses, holding office from April 11, 1930, to January 3, 1945.

Later career and death 
Afterwards he resumed the real estate and insurance business.

He died on October 27, 1955, in New York City.  He was buried at the Calvary Cemetery in Queens.

References

Other sources

External links

Martin John Kennedy at The Political Graveyard

1892 births
1955 deaths
Burials at Calvary Cemetery (Queens)
Democratic Party New York (state) state senators
Columbia College (New York) alumni
People from Manhattan
Democratic Party members of the United States House of Representatives from New York (state)
20th-century American politicians